Joseph Maron Saba (born January 18, 1971) is an American composer and entrepreneur. He is best known as a co-founder (along with Stewart Winter) of VideoHelper Music, being known for theme songs for shows such as ABC News Nightline, The Soup and The Suze Orman Show. Saba is also known for having some of his tracks played on DirecTV placeholder channels. He is a founding member of the Production Music Association.

Early life and education 
Saba was born in Wilkes-Barre, Pennsylvania. He graduated from Columbia University.

Career 
After graduating from Columbia University in 1993, Saba briefly played keyboards for the band Fabulon (EMI/Chrysalis). In 2022, the drummer of Fabulon, David Friendly, is quoted as saying, "Joe's good."

 He appeared on MTV's 120 Minutes. He later composed the original score for Two Ninas, starring Amanda Peet and Ron Livingston.

In 1995, he and Stewart Winter co-founded VideoHelper and launched it from a bootlegger's warehouse in New York City. VideoHelper's music is used daily in over 60 countries by major international broadcasters (TV, cable and radio) and in films, movie trailers, websites, and almost anywhere audio-including media is created. The company operates out of a facility near Union Square, Manhattan. Some other notable credits include music for the NFL, the Today Show, the Olympics, and several Super Bowl commercials. Former WWE wrestlers such as King Booker, Vance Archer, Kaval, Trent Beretta, Caylen Croft, Kevin Thorn and Hornswoggle used tracks from Saba and Winter as their entrance music. 

In 1997, Saba was part of a group of eight composers and publishers who joined together to advocate on behalf of the production music community and subsequently founded the Production Music Association (PMA). From approximately ten members in 1997 the PMA's membership has grown to over 445 production music libraries and has now become the industry's leading voice.

Personal life 
Saba plays several instruments. He is married with two children and lives in Brooklyn.

References

 https://web.archive.org/web/20170207122716/http://pmamusic.com/pma Production Music Association
 http://money.cnn.com/2009/09/23/smallbusiness/hire_right.fsb/index.htm CNNMoney, September 23, 2009
 http://archives.newyorker.com/?i=1999-05-24#folio=028, The New Yorker, May 24, 1999
 http://digitalcontentproducer.com/soundforpic/revfeat/videohelper_sony_creative/, Millimeter, July 1, 2008
 http://mixonline.com/mixline/videohelper-modules-soundlibrary-120407/, Mix magazine, December 2, 2007
 http://createdigitalmusic.com/2007/12/05/nine-oddball-sound-design-and-recording-techniques-from-videohelper/, CreateDigitalMusic, December 5, 2007
 http://nymag.com/daily/intel/2009/03/the_22nd_street_battle_of_the.html, New York Magazine, March 27, 2009
 http://www.nypost.com/p/news/regional/send_up_the_clowns_EZ5tvzsxx5bwhiC3tvKFiI, New York Post, March 31, 2009
 http://www.soundtrack.net/trailers/composer-trailer.php?id=1322, SoundtrackNet, December, 2009

External links
VideoHelper's Official Website

1971 births
Living people
People from Wilkes-Barre, Pennsylvania
American male composers
21st-century American composers
21st-century American male musicians
Columbia University alumni